Jeff Chang Shin-che (Pha̍k-fa-sṳ: Chong Sìn-chet; born 26 March 1967) is a Taiwanese singer and actor, who is known for his numerous chart-topping sentimental Mandarin pop ballads.

Early life 
Chang was born in Xiluo Township, Yunlin County, Taiwan. He started his philanthropic works as a voluntary teacher in impoverished areas of Taiwan since he was in high school.

Career 
He started off his showbiz career by winning a singing competition while in college, in which Hsiao-Wen Ting was a judge. Since 1989 he has released a string of highly successful albums and is known as the "Prince of Love Ballads" in the Chinese pop world. His name is well known across Taiwan, Hong Kong, Southeast Asia and mainland China.

Besides singing, Chang's interests include arts, antiques, traveling and water sports, and stage production. He became Taipei's leader in a stage theatre team in 2011.

In 2016, Chang participated in the fourth season of the Chinese reality show I Am A Singer and eventually achieved second place.

Discography 
Compilations are listed only if they contain never-released-before singles.

Mandarin
 Lie  (1989)
Blue  (1989)
 Forget Me Not  (1989)
Knowing  (1992)
 Worrying  (1993)
 Waiting  (1994)
 Possession  (1995)
 Intoxicated  (1995)
Generosity  (1995)
 Dream  (1996)
 Adore  (1997)
 Intuition  (1997)
Please Come Back  (1999)
Faith  (2000)
How I Miss  (2001)
Beginning → Now  (2002)
 The Next Eternity  (2004)
Be Your Man  (2006)
Escape  (2008)
 Genesis  (2010)
 Unfinished Childhood  (2011)
 Spare Time  (2012)
Love Jeff (还爱) (2015)
Song Era(歌时代）(2016)
Everlasting (擁恆) (2017)
Song Era II (歌時代II) (2018)
See the Light (就懂了) (2021)

Cantonese
 Deep Love  (February 1996)
 Longing / Thinking  (January 1997)
 The Best Collection of Jeff Chang  (1998)
Full of Mercy  (July 1998) 
 August Snow  (2007)

English
 My Eyes Adored You (1992)
 Somewhere in My Broken Heart  (1995)
 The Color of the Night  (1996)
A Matter of Love (Jan 2021)

Selected filmography

Film

Television series

Awards and nominations

References

External links
 
 Official blog 
 Official website 
 Jeff Chang's albums lyrics, pinyin lyrics, english translation

1967 births
Living people
20th-century Taiwanese  male singers
21st-century Taiwanese  male singers
Cantonese-language singers of Taiwan
Taiwanese male film actors
Taiwanese male stage actors
21st-century Taiwanese male actors
Cantopop singers
Taiwanese Mandopop singers
Ballad musicians
Taiwanese Christians
People from Yunlin County